Gotoblemus ii is a species of beetle in the family Carabidae, the only species in the genus Gotoblemus.

References

Trechinae